The St. Louis Subdivision is a railroad line owned by CSX Transportation and leased to the Evansville Western Railway in the U.S. states of Indiana and Illinois. At its south end it branches off the Evansville Terminal Subdivision and at its north end the track comes to an end.

References

See also
 List of CSX Transportation lines

CSX Transportation lines
Rail infrastructure in Indiana
Rail infrastructure in Illinois